Bollini Munuswamy Naidu (1885 – 1935) was the Chief Minister of Madras Presidency from 27 October 1930 to 4 November 1932. He was conferred 'Rao Diwan Bahadur' by British Government.

Munuswamy Naidu was born in Tiruttani, Madras Presidency in 1885 in a family of agriculturists. He studied law and worked as a lawyer and businessman. He was one of the early members of the Justice Party. On the death of the Raja of Panagal in 1928, Munuswamy Naidu was appointed president of the Justice Party.

Munuswamy Naidu served as the president of the Justice Party from 1928 to 1932. Under his leadership, the Justice Party won the 1930 Madras Assembly elections and Munuswamy Naidu served as Chief Minister or Premier from 1930 to 1932. During Naidu's tenure, Madras was engulfed in a financial crisis arising out of the Great Depression. His tenure is also remembered for his clash with zamindars and his rivalry with the Raja of Bobbili. Naidu resigned in 1932 sensing serious opposition in party ranks. He lost the leadership of the party to the Raja of Bobbili and eventually retired from active politics. Munuswamy Naidu died in 1935.
Munuswamy Naidu was a close associate of N. G. Ranga. Naidu's leadership is also remembered for his efforts to remove restrictions on Brahmins joining the party.

Early life 
Munuswamy Naidu was born in 1885 in Velanjeri in Tiruttani, Chittoor district of farmers. He was the first Chief Minister from the Justice Party with an agriculturist background.

Munuswamy Naidu had his early education at Madras Christian College and graduated in law and practised as a lawyer. He was also a moneylender, farmer and businessman and owned a mill in Chittoor district.

Rise to power 
The Raja of Panagal, President of the South Indian Liberal Federation, died on 18 December 1928. Munuswamy Naidu was nominated to succeed him. Munuswamy Naidu led the Justice Party throughout its period in opposition between 1928 and 1930. He also led  the party during the assembly elections held in 1930.

In the elections held in October 1930 in Madras Presidency, the Justice Party fielded 45 candidates and was in an alliance with the Ministerialists. As the Tamil Nadu Congress Committee did not participate in the elections, the Justice Party swept to power without encountering any serious opposition. The Justice Party secured an overwhelming majority in the districts  of Vizagapatam, Chingleput, West Godavari, Bellary, Trichinopoly and Tinnevely. It claimed to have won nearly 70% of the total number of votes polled.

B. Munuswamy Naidu, the leader of the Justice Party, formed a government on 27 October 1930.

As Chief Minister of Madras Presidency 
Munuswamy Naidu took office as Chief Minister on 27 October 1930 and served till 4 November 1932 Munuswamy Naidu's tenure as Chief Minister was afflicted by controversies. He assumed the Chief Ministership at a critical juncture. The Great Depression was at its height and the economy was crumbling. Moreover, the southern districts of the Presidency had been afflicted by floods. The government was, therefore, compelled to increase the land tax in order to compensate for the fall in prices.

Soon after Munuswamy Naidu formed the government, the Justice Party was torn apart by factionalism. The Zamindars who had supported the Justice Party were disgruntled at the fact that two of the foremost landlords of the Presidency, the Raja of Bobbili and the Kumara Raja of Venkatagiri had not been included in the Cabinet. Under the leadership of M. A. Muthiah Chettiar, the disgruntled Zamindars organized a "ginger group" in November 1930.

This "ginger group" accused Munuswamy Naidu of having a soft corner for the Indian National Congress and Swarajists. Moreover, Munuswamy Naidu was also close to N. G. Ranga, the leader of the Ministerialists who were opposed to the Zamindars. Munuswamy Naidu gave his explanation

When two of his ministers, P. T. Rajan and S. Kumaraswami Reddiar resigned their posts, Munuswamy Naidu resigned before any no-confidence motion could be brought forward. He r. Munuswamy Naidu was succeeded by the Raja of Bobbili as Chief Minister.

End of party leadership 
The Twelfth Annual Confederation of the Justice Party was held at Tanjore on 10 – 11 October 1932.  The Raja of Bobbili was chosen to preside over it. However, a faction supporting Munuswamy Naidu (then the Chief Minister) refused to allow the proceedings to continue. An eyewitness records that furniture and shoes were hurled around by members of opposing factions. However, the Raja of Bobbili prevailed and eventually assumed the leadership. This marked the end of Munuswamy Naidu's influence in the party and he gradually faded from limelight.

Later life and death 
Post Premiership, Munuswamy Naidu formed a separate party called Justice Democratic Party with his supporters and additionally had the support of 20 opposition members in the legislative council. He died in 1935 and his supporters rejoined the Justice party. A road in K. K. Nagar, Chennai has been named after him as Munuswamy Salai. (The caste suffix "Naidu" was dropped when caste suffixes were dropped from names of public places). A Bridge in the village Penamaluru in Krishna District of Andhra Pradesh was named after him.

Ideology 
Munuswamy Naidu was a staunch supporter of the Justice Party and the non-Brahmin movement. At the same time, he also supported the  admission of Brahmins in the party.

At a tripartite conference between the Justice Party, Ministerialists and Constitutionalists in Madras in 1929 a resolution was adopted recommending the removal of restrictions on Brahmins joining the organization. The executive committee of the party drafted a resolution to this effect and placed it before the Eleventh Confederation of the party at Nellore, for approval. At this Confederation, Munuswamy Naidu spoke:

However, the resolution faced strong opposition and was eventually withdrawn.

References

Cited sources 

 

1885 births
1935 deaths
Telugu politicians
Chief Ministers of Tamil Nadu
Madras Christian College alumni
University of Madras alumni
People from Chittoor district